Omidcheh may refer to:
 Omidcheh, Ardabil
 Omidcheh, Meshgin Shahr, Ardabil Province
 Omidcheh, East Azerbaijan